Atalanta and Hippomenes is a 1620–1625 oil on canvas painting by Guido Reni, now in the National Museum of Capodimonte in Naples. The work was a second version of a 1618–1619 version of the subject by the artist which is now in the Prado Museum.

References

Paintings depicting Greek myths
Paintings by Guido Reni
1625 paintings
Paintings in the collection of the Museo di Capodimonte